Mersereau is a surname. Notable people with the surname include:

Bob Mersereau, Canadian arts journalist
Jacques Mersereau, set decorator
Marcelle Mersereau (born 1942), Canadian politician
Paul Mersereau (1873–?), French painter
Scott Mersereau (born 1965), American football player
Violet Mersereau (1892–1975), American stage and film actress
John LaGrange Mersereau (1731–1820), American spy and soldier
Joshua Mersereau (1728–1804), Major in the United States army

See also
Mersereau Ring